The Lawrence Campbell Oratory Competition  is an annual competition in impromptu public speaking between representatives of each of the Great Public Schools (GPS) and Combined Associated Schools (CAS) in New South Wales, Australia. It was established in 1935, in honour of Lawrence Campbell, a famous teacher of elocution in various schools in Sydney, in the early twentieth century. Between 2006 and 2013, in all but one year (2009), the competition was won by a student in year 11. At the 2015 World University Debating Championships in Malaysia, three of the eight speakers in the Grand Final (representing Sydney, Oxford, and Harvard) were former Lawrence Campbell winners – a testament to the quality of the Lawrence Campbell competition.

Format 
The Lawrence Campbell Oratory is widely regarded as the most prestigious, and difficult of the New South Wales Public Speaking Competitions. Each school is represented by one speaker. Each speaker is required to give a speech of eight minutes length of one of three topics given to him or her 15 minutes beforehand. In this competition, the emphasis is on oratory, the art of speech, and so the manner of delivery counts at least equally with the subject matter. The emphasis is on giving a speech that combines humour with pathos, dramatic elements with more conversational moments, serious commentary with light-hearted asides, quotations drawn from a variety of sources, but all around a common thread based on the chosen topic, and showing the style of the candidate. Accordingly, the style of speech is very different from many other public speaking competitions in which candidates research and prepare speeches of their own in advance, often on questions of current affairs or public policy. With only fifteen minutes to prepare and without the aid of books or references, the content of the speech will test the candidates' general knowledge and ingenuity.

Participating schools 

Each school is represented by one speaker. Saint Ignatius’ College has the most distinguished history, with twenty-two winning candidates in the competition's history. Waverley College and The Armidale School have never fielded a winning candidate.

Topics 
Because of the emphasis on oratory, the topics usually admit of wide latitude for the candidates to be creative. Often, quotations from literature, public figures, and popular culture are chosen as topics, along with proverbs or even single words.  Past topics include:
 Assume a virtue if you have it not
 One crowded hour of glorious life is worth an age without a name
 I must follow them, for I am their leader
 He thinks too much – such men are dangerous
 Because it was there
 The devil can recite scripture for his purpose
 The fault, dear Brutus, lies not in the stars
 I am Fate's lieutenant; I act under orders
 Couch Jumping
 Right as the world goes is only in issue between equals in power while the strong do as they will and the weak suffer as they must
 Chaos Often Breeds Life When Order Breeds Habit
 Look at my works, you mighty, and despair
 Two cheers for Democracy
 Blood will have Blood

Notable past winners 
The Lawrence Campbell oratory competition has many distinguished previous winners, particularly in the areas of law, politics, and the arts. Famous past winners include:

 Nick Enright (Riverview, playwright)
 Charles Firth (Sydney Grammar, comedian and television personality from The Chaser team)
 Murray Gleeson (St. Joseph's, Chief Justice of Australia)
 Nick Greiner (Riverview, former Premier of NSW)
 John Hamilton (Judge of the Supreme Court of NSW)
 Clifton Hoeben (Riverview, judge of the Supreme Court of NSW)
 Wayne Hudson (Newington, professor and visiting fellow at ANU)
 Mungo MacCallum (Cranbrook, journalist and member of the Wentworth squatocracy)
 Andrew O'Keefe (Riverview, comedian and television presenter)
 Adam Spencer (St. Aloysius', ABC Television and radio presenter)
 Malcolm Turnbull (Sydney Grammar, former Prime Minister of Australia)
 Lloyd Waddy (monarchist, Judge of the Family Court)
 Anthony Whealy (Judge of the Supreme Court of NSW)

The only people to have won the competition on two occasions are:

 RW Bowie (Sydney Grammar – 1939, 1940)
 Murray Gleeson (St Joseph's – 1953, 1955)
 Anthony Jones (Scots – 1999, 2000)
 Jeremy Raper (Sydney Grammar – 2001, 2002)
 Joseph Ware (Barker College – 2008, 2009)

Controversies 
There have been many controversies in the history of the competition. These usually arise out of allegations of plagiarism and the use of prepared material in the speech.

Often, the candidate is given the benefit of any doubt, if only because candidates train intensively for the competition and must necessarily think of themes, quotations, and one-liners that may emerge in the speech the candidate later gives at the competition.  However, the wholesale repetition of prepared material is strongly discouraged, and with enough proof, a winner may be stripped of the title if wholesale preparation is shown.

Previous winners and runners-up 
Public speaking competitions
Combined Associated Schools
Competitions in Australia
1935 establishments in Australia
Recurring events established in 1935

Notes